Linnaeus's Hammarby is a historic house museum and mansion, and one of three botanical gardens belonging to Uppsala University, located in Sweden. It is situated about 10 km south-east of Uppsala.

Carl Linnaeus
The manor house Hammarby was the former summer home of  Carl Linnaeus and his family.  Carl Linnaeus was a scientist and professor at Uppsala University. In 1762 Linnaeus bought the small estate of Hammarby in order to spend his holidays in a quiet place.

Buildings
The main house of Linnaeus has two floors, an attic and a cellar under part of the house. The house is constructed of horizontal logs.

Inside the house, the old wallpaper is distinguished, with flower design in dark red, gold and white. It was probably made c. 1880.

There are two other buildings in the compound. The east wing building housed the bakehouse and brewery. The west wing building probably housed the estate's staff and workers.

Museum
The Linnaeus's Hammarby is a historic house and gardens museum. In 1935 the museum was declared a historical monument, and is administered by the National Property Board. The estate is currently run by Uppsala University.

See also
 Linnaean Garden
 Corydalis nobilis

References

External links

Botanical gardens of Uppsala University
Manor houses in Sweden
Historic house museums in Sweden
Museums in Uppsala
Commemoration of Carl Linnaeus